Chalvedon School and 6th Form College was a Specialist Technology College in Pitsea, Essex, England.
It was a comprehensive school educating pupils aged between 11 and 18 years of age. 
Chalvedon had over 1800 pupils on roll including 196 sixth formers.

The school was first opened in 1966 and operated on the same site until its formal closure. 
Mr A S Roach became the Principal of the school in 1988.

In January 2006 Chalvedon School federated with another local comprehensive school, Barstable School, to form the Federation of East Basildon. In 2009 the school formally closed with pupils transferring to the newly created Basildon Academies.

Notable alumni
Angela Smith, MP for Basildon
Scott Robinson, singer of the boy band Five
James Tomkins, West Ham Utd footballer
James Lawson, former Southend Utd footballer
QBoy, Music Artist
Denise Van Outen, actress, singer, dancer and presenter

References

External links
Chalvedon’s website

Defunct schools in Essex
Borough of Basildon
Educational institutions established in 1966
1966 establishments in England
Educational institutions disestablished in 2009
2009 disestablishments in England